Sibulan Airport (Cebuano: Tugpahanan sa Sibulan; Filipino: Paliparan ng Sibulan), also known as Dumaguete Airport or Dumaguete–Sibulan Airport, is an airport serving the general area of the city of Dumaguete, located in the province of Negros Oriental in the Philippines. The airport is one of two major airports serving Negros Island, the other being Bacolod–Silay Airport in Silay, Negros Occidental.

The airport is classified as a Class 1 principal (major domestic) airport by the Civil Aviation Authority of the Philippines, the body of the Department of Transportation that is responsible for the operations of not only this airport but also of all other airports in the Philippines except the major international airports.

History
The airport was built by the Philippine government with supervision and guidance from the United States Army Air Corps in 1938. The runway, running in a north–south direction, was completed in March 1939 and was used by civilian and military aircraft. During the Japanese occupation of the Philippines as part of the Second World War, in 1942, two parallel runways running in an east–west direction were constructed. The northern runway was used as the main runway while the southern runway was a secondary (auxiliary) runway. By 1945, the airfield was liberated by the U.S. Army. The present-day runway was then extended to the current dimensions.

In 2017, the air traffic control system was upgraded, and new navigational equipment were installed, making the airport capable of handling night operations. Cebu Pacific became the first airline to operate night flights to the airport in July of that year.

On March 11, 2021, after upgrade works were made, then-President Rodrigo Duterte inaugurated the newly-expanded airport.

Future development
Lawmakers have been proposing to transfer the airport in the town of Bacong, south of Dumaguete since 2014. This was chosen over the initial plan of expanding Sibulan Airport, in which studies conducted by the Japan International Cooperation Agency and the Korea International Cooperation Agency concluded that such an expansion of the current airport is not feasible. Although there were proposals to build the airport in the nearby cities of Bais and Tanjay and the municipality of Siaton, Bacong was the most preferred due to its use for constructing a northeast–southwest runway, which planes can land and take off in that direction, and its safety-oriented location ideal for future expansion. Moreover, the east–west direction of the Sibulan Airport runway as well as the prevalence of crosswinds was dangerous for planes landing and taking off.

Airlines and destinations

Accidents and incidents
 On July 1, 1970, a Philippine Airlines Fokker F27 Friendship 200 with 29 people on board skidded off the runway. None of those on board were injured or damaged.
 On August 14, 2018, Philippine Airlines Flight 2451 from Manila experienced problems with its tires. Its left tire blew off as it landed on the runway. All 115 passengers plus six crew were safely brought to the passenger terminal.

Notes

References

External links
 CAAP (web archive)

Airports in the Philippines
Buildings and structures in Dumaguete